Tahnoun bin Zayed Al Nahyan (born 4 December 1968) is the son of the founder of the United Arab Emirates, Sheikh Zayed bin Sultan Al Nahyan and serves as the National Security Advisor of UAE. He has previously served as Deputy National Security Advisor in 2013. He manages a business portfolio that supports national security interests and the UAE's opaque corporate sector.

He is part of the ruling family in Abu Dhabi. He is the brother of UAE President Sheikh Mohamed bin Zayed Al Nahyan. His other brothers are Sheikh Hamdan bin Zayed, Sheikh Hazza bin Zayed, Sheikh Mansour bin Zayed and Sheikh Abdullah bin Zayed Al Nahyan, UAE's foreign minister.

Business career
He is chairman of ADQ (a state holding company), First Abu Dhabi Bank (the UAE's largest lender), Royal Group (a conglomerate) and International Holding Company.

Political career

Deputy National Security Advisor (2013–2016)

National Security Advisor (2016–present)
Sheikh Tahnoun received Yossi Cohen, the Head of Israeli Intelligence Agency, Mossad on 18 August 2020, after the success of the UAE-Israel peace accord.

Controversies

Violation of sanctions 
On 16 August 2020, The Wall Street Journal reported about the administration led by US President Donald Trump of imposing several sanctions against the government of Syrian President Bashar al-Assad, targeting financial-support networks aiding the President from outside the country, to coerce Damascus into peace talks. According to financial records reviewed by The Wall Street Journal, Sheikh Tahnoun deposited about $200,000 into the bank accounts held by the niece of Syrian President Assad, Aniseh Shawkat, over a period of several years as her sponsor. The UK authorities seized several of these bank accounts in 2019, claiming that hundreds of thousands of dollars deposited in the accounts of Ms Aniseh helped circumvent European Union’s sanctions against the Syrian government funds. Sheikh Tahnoun, Aniseh Shawkat and her attorney Zubair Ahmad did not respond when reached out for comment.

Project Raven
The Central Intelligence Agency of the United States was condemned for spying to all nations in the Arab world and Middle East region, except the UAE, despite the Gulf nation having hired former CIA officials for its Project Raven to spy on political targets, including several American in 2014. Sheikh Tahnoun was the Deputy National Security Advisor to UAE back then.

Multiple ex-CIA officials have told Reuters that the agency does not gather "human intelligence" from the UAE informant because it shares common enemies with the United States. Retired CIA official "Norman Roule" defended the US for not spying on the Emirates, stating that the actions committed by Abu Dhabi have "contributed to the war on terror, particularly against al-Queda [Qaeda] in Yemen."

Re-selling COVID-19 vaccines
Sheik Tahnoun runs the Royal Group, which is a UAE conglomerate. In 2021, the company was involved in controversial deals to re-sell Russia's Sputnik vaccine to poor countries at substantial mark-ups.

US lobbying
Sheikh Tahnoun was named in the lobbying scandal of Tom Barrack, advisor and fundraiser of former US President Donald Trump. As per the indictment against Barrack, he was charged with lobbying the former administration on behalf of the UAE government and royals without registering himself as a foreign agent of the Gulf nation. The indictment cites three Emirati officials as number 1, 2 and 3, which as per people familiar with the matter are, Sheikh Tahnoun as the Emirati Official 2 and his brother and Abu Dhabi Crown Prince Sheikh Mohammed bin Zayed Al Nahyan as Emirati Official 1. The director of the Emirati intelligence service on the other hand was named as Official 3 in the indictment. In 2022, Barrack was found not guilty on all charges.

Pandora Papers
In October 2021, the International Consortium of Investigative Journalists (ICIJ) released a report based on over 11.9 million documents, which also mentioned the name of Tahnoun bin Zayed, alongside Mohammed bin Rashid Al Maktoum and Hazza bin Zayed Al Nahyan.

QatarGate scandal
In December 2022, Qatar denied its involvement in the alleged bribery case. The Qatari government accused the UAE of orchestrating the scandal. European Union correspondent Jack Parrock confirmed Qatari government officials believe that the scandal against Qatar has been planned by the UAE.  An Italian news site, Dagospia alleged that it was the UAE national adviser Tahnoun bin Zayed Al Nahyan who executed the scandal against Qatar and provided tips to Belgium, which opened the investigation.

Sporting interests
Sheikh Tahnoun is an avid practitioner and patron of martial arts, especially Brazilian jiu-jitsu. In 1998, he created the ADCC Submission Fighting World Championship alongside his BJJ instructor Nelson Monteiro.

References

House of Al Nahyan
Living people
1971 births
 People awarded a black belt in Brazilian jiu-jitsu
People named in the Pandora Papers
Sons of monarchs